There are over 20,000 Grade II* listed buildings in England. This article comprises a list of these buildings in the county of Shropshire Council.

List 

|}

See also 
 Grade I listed buildings in Shropshire

References

External links 

Shrop